Japanese city pop band Omega Tribe have gone through four official name changes from its inception in 1983: Kiyotaka Sugiyama & Omega Tribe (1983–1985), 1986 Omega Tribe (1986–1987), Carlos Toshiki & Omega Tribe (1987–1991), and Brand New Omega Tribe (1993–1994). The band has also had many one-offs and offshoot bands throughout the years, including DOME (1992), Weather Side (1994–1996), and B-EDGE (2015–present). Before the formation of S. Kiyotaka & Omega Tribe, the band was previously named Cutie Panchos (1978–1983). Throughout the Omega Tribe eras, the bands have released twelve studio albums and 21 singles.

S. Kiyotaka & Omega Tribe started production on Aqua City, with industry veteran Tetsuji Hayashi doing most of the composition, on February 8, 1983. It featured lyricists Yasushi Akimoto and Chinfa Kan while Tsugutoshi Gotō and Ken Shiguma helped with arrangement. The goal of the album was to create the band's new identity as a summer pop band, using a collection of songs with themes of summer, the beach, and the sea. The album released on September 21, 1983, charting at No. 4 on the Oricon charts. They then released their second album, River's Island, on March 21, 1984, taking a different approach to their sound by imitating the West Coast-style with the image of the city. The album did well, charting at No. 3 on the Oricon charts. Their next album, Never Ending Summer completed its production on November 2 and was released on December 21. The album also did worse than its predecessor, charting at No. 8, but exceeded it in terms of sales. The band started production of their fourth studio album, Another Summer, cutting down on the orchestral and brass sound and replacing it with the Moog Polymoog and the Yamaha DX7. In April 1985, Kenji Yoshida left the band during the production as he grew impatient with the disbandment near the end of the year. The band completed the album on May 20, 1985. Another Summer was released on July 1, 1985, and gave the band their first No. 1 album on the Oricon charts. Hayashi, who was informed by producer Koichi Fujita that same year about the band's disbandment, met with singer Kiyotaka Sugiyama one night to try to make him reconsider the disbandment. He wanted to prolong the time of the band since they had many hit records and had a smooth sailing career, but Sugiyama did not reverse his decision. As a final wish, Hayashi requested that the group make a final album for the fans, giving the album the title First Finale.

In 1986, with a new singer, Carlos Toshiki, 1986 Omega Tribe released their debut album Navigator on July 23, 1986, reaching No. 2 on the charts and selling 433,590 copies. The band started production on their second album, Crystal Night near the end of 1986, with the production team showing an interest in electric sounds based on American black contemporary music, as with many other artists at the time. The album used digital synths, analog synths, and samplers along with digital reverb by arrangers who specialized in sound design, such as Motoki Funayama and Hiroshi Shinkawa. Crystal Night was released on February 4, 1987, charting at No. 2 on the Oricon chart. The band were also awarded a Japan Gold Disc Award for Navigator.

On March 6, 1988, the newly renamed Carlos Toshiki & Omega Tribe released the title single "Down Town Mystery," which included a "Daylight Version" and a "Nighttime Version" which were mixed differently by Eiji Uchinuma and Kunihiko Shimizu respectively. The "Nighttime Version" was used as the A-side. The album Down Town Mystery was released on April 6, 1988, in the "Daylight" and "Nighttime" versions. The band then hired American singer Joey McCoy as an official member, and on February 8, 1989, the band released their second album Be Yourself, which sold well at No. 9 on the charts. They released their third album, Bad Girl, on September 21 and peaked at No. 26 on the charts. Bad Girl had lyricists from "" as well as Yasushi Akimoto and Yasuharu Konishi. In 1990, the band transferred from VAP to Warner Pioneer for unknown reasons and would release their final album Natsuko on July 27, 1990. The cover art was handled by Mineko Ueda with Akimoto returning as lyricist.

In 1993, a fourth and final iteration of Omega Tribe was formed by Fujita called Brand New Omega Tribe (shortened to BNOT). Unlike the previous versions of the band, BNOT consisted only of Masahito Arai, who was previously the lead vocalist of the group Pal and had started his solo career in 1986. They released their only studio album Beach Hippies on January 25, 1994. Both the single and album were unsuccessful as their counterparts, so the project broke up after the album's release.

Cutie Panchos

Studio albums

Singles

S. Kiyotaka & Omega Tribe

Studio albums

Compilation and remix albums

Live albums

Singles

1986 Omega Tribe

Studio albums

Compilation albums

Singles

Promotional singles

Carlos Toshiki & Omega Tribe

Studio albums

Compilation albums

Live albums

Singles

Promotional singles

Deconstructed Omega by Mints Entertainment

Studio albums

Singles

Brand New Omega Tribe

Studio albums

Singles

Weather Side

Studio albums

Singles

B-EDGE

References 

Discographies of Japanese artists
Discography
Rock music group discographies